The forty-seventh season of the NBC sketch comedy series Saturday Night Live premiered on October 2, 2021, during the 2021–22 television season with host Owen Wilson and musical guest Kacey Musgraves, and concluded on May 21, 2022 with host Natasha Lyonne and musical guest Japanese Breakfast. For the first time, the season's first five episodes and the remainder from episode ten onward were live-streamed on the streaming service Peacock in addition to its coast-to-coast live television broadcast.

Cast
Prior to the start of the season, longtime cast member Beck Bennett departed after spending eight seasons on the show since 2013. Featured player Lauren Holt, who had joined the show for the previous season, was let go after the finale. Despite Bennett and Holt's departures, the rest of the cast from the previous season was retained.

Three new featured players were added: comedic actor and filmmaker Aristotle Athari, impressionist and actor James Austin Johnson, and surrealist comedian Sarah Sherman. Chloe Fineman and Bowen Yang, who were both hired as featured players for Season 45, were promoted to repertory status this season, while Andrew Dismukes and Punkie Johnson, both of whom were hired for Season 46, remained as featured players.

Kate McKinnon did not appear in the first seven episodes of the season, as she was filming Joe vs. Carole. Cecily Strong was absent from the first three episodes of 2022 due to her appearance in the Off-Broadway revival of the one-woman play The Search for Signs of Intelligent Life in the Universe. Pete Davidson was absent from the thirteenth until the twentieth episode due to filming the movie The Home.

Don Roy King, who had directed the show since Season 32, retired after the ninth episode, hosted by Paul Rudd. He was succeeded by Liz Patrick, a longtime director of The Ellen DeGeneres Show. In addition, longtime producer and head of talent relations Lindsay Shookus left the show after 20 years.

This season saw the deaths of four former cast members; on September 14, 2021, a month before the season began, former cast member and Weekend Update anchor Norm Macdonald died at the age of 61 after a nine-year battle with leukemia. Two months later, on November 6, former featured player Peter Aykroyd died at the age of 65 from sepsis caused by an untreated abdominal hernia. Later in the season, on April 12, 2022, at the age of 67, season 6 cast member Gilbert Gottfried died after a long illness from a rare ventricular tachycardia disorder complicated by type II myotonic dystrophy. On May 6, season 11 cast member Dan Vitale died from heart disease at the age of 66.

This was the final season for McKinnon and Aidy Bryant, who both had been cast members since 2012, Kyle Mooney, who had been a cast member since 2013, and Davidson, who had been with the cast since 2014. 

On September 1, 2022, it was announced that Melissa Villaseñor and Alex Moffat, both cast members since 2016, would be departing the show alongside first-year featured player Aristotle Athari.

On September 19, 2022, it was also announced that Chris Redd, who had been a cast member since 2017, would be departing the show.

Cast roster

Repertory players
 Aidy Bryant
 Michael Che
 Pete Davidson
 Mikey Day
 Chloe Fineman
 Heidi Gardner
 Colin Jost
 Kate McKinnon
 Alex Moffat
 Kyle Mooney
 Ego Nwodim
 Chris Redd
 Cecily Strong
 Kenan Thompson 
 Melissa Villaseñor
 Bowen Yang

Featured players
 Aristotle Athari
 Andrew Dismukes
 James Austin Johnson
 Punkie Johnson
 Sarah Sherman

bold denotes "Weekend Update" anchor

Writers

Prior to the start of the season, the show hired ten new writers: Mike DiCenzo, Billy Domineau, Alex English, Martin Herlihy, John Higgins, Vanessa Jackson, Tesha Kondrat, Ben Marshall, Jake Nordwind, and Ben Silva. Herlihy, Higgins, and Marshall performed sketches throughout this season as the comedy troupe Please Don't Destroy. Anna Drezen, Michael Che, Colin Jost, and Kent Sublette continued as the show's head writers, though after the Paul Rudd episode, Drezen left to focus on her new show for Freeform. It was also the last season for writers Jasmine Pierce and Steven Castillo (who also left after the Paul Rudd episode).

Alison Gates, who has written for the show since 2018, was promoted to writing supervisor. Gates and Streeter Seidell joined Che, Jost, and Sublette as head writers beginning with the Ariana DeBose episode.

Beginning with the John Mulaney episode, three new writers were hired: Rosebud Baker, Clare O'Kane and Nicole Sun.

Episodes

Specials

Reception
In January 2022, Matthew Gilbert of The Boston Globe wrote that he was "surprised with the mediocrity" of the season, suggesting that individual cast members did not have opportunities to stand out; he cited the high number of players compared to past seasons, the periodic absence of some cast members due to other commitments, and regular use of guest stars and cameo appearances in sketches as possible reasons.

Conversely, Michael Boyle of Slate praised the season's filmed sketches featuring the Please Don't Destroy troupe, writing, "The basic character dynamics should be familiar to anyone who’s watched SNL before, but they’re done with an efficiency that puts the rest of the show to shame."

New cast member James Austin Johnson and his impression of former U.S. President Donald Trump, which debuted on the show this season, received a positive reception from critics. Dennis Perkins of The A.V. Club wrote, "Johnson's Trump is as exact as advertised, and his Trump's discursively narcissistic screed is more comically illuminating than four full years of Alec Baldwin making funny Trump faces." Dan Spinelli of Mother Jones lauded the accuracy of Johnson's impression, writing, "Close your eyes and you'll think new cast member James Austin Johnson is the real thing. He nails the preening self-regard, the incessant need for attention, and the way Trump wields 'excuse me' almost as a verbal saber." Gilbert, however, criticized Johnson's impression of President Joe Biden and opined it was not as good as his version of Trump. Andy Hoglund at Entertainment Weekly concurs, citing Johnson's "commendable if slightly less transcendent work as" the president.

Another new cast member, Sarah Sherman, received positive reviews from the entertainment press for adapting her unusual and surreal comedy style to the show. Luka Katic of Collider wrote, "Sherman certainly isn't the first unconventional comedian to be featured on SNL (i.e. Tim Robinson, Kyle Mooney, etc.). However, what makes her remarkable is her success in spite of that fact. Where actors like Robinson often felt they had to tone down their material for SNL, Sherman finds inventive alternative ways to channel her deranged sensibilities into the show." Jesse Hassenger of Vulture listed Sherman's "Meatballs" sketch from the Oscar Isaac/Charli XCX episode as one of the best of the season, writing "In a crowded season, it was especially refreshing to come upon a sketch that feels like such a clear expression of its star’s sensibilities."

Notes

References

47
Saturday Night Live in the 2020s
2021 American television seasons
2022 American television seasons
Television shows directed by Don Roy King